Windy Riley Goes Hollywood is a 1931 American pre-Code short comedy film directed by Roscoe Arbuckle using the pseudonym of William Goodrich and starring Louise Brooks and Jack Shutta. The picture is a loose adaptation of Kenneth Kling's comic strip Windy Riley.

Plot
Nearing the end of a solo self-promotional cross-country road trip from New York to San Francisco, Windy Riley ends up in Hollywood by mistake due to an inadvertently turned-around sign. His car is repossessed, but the repo man gets into a car accident with a movie mogul. The repo man blames Windy, and as Windy has no money, the mogul puts him to work in his studio's publicity department.

The studio's star actress, Betty Grey, has been warned that her contract will be terminated if she gets any more bad publicity. Unaware of this, Windy kidnaps Betty's director, LaRoss, and hides him in a railroad boxcar, intending to reap some publicity (as the movie Betty is currently working on is called The Boxcar Mystery). A reporter learns that LaRoss is missing and prepares to splash the news across the front page. Windy retrieves LaRoss, who then gives the reporter a different story to print - that he and Betty are getting married. Windy goes back to New York.

Cast
 Jack Shutta as Windy Riley
 Louise Brooks as Betty Grey
 William B. Davidson
 Wilbur Mack
 Dell Henderson
 Walter Merrill

See also
 Fatty Arbuckle filmography

Sources

External links

1931 films
1931 comedy films
American black-and-white films
American comedy short films
Educational Pictures short films
Films directed by Roscoe Arbuckle
Films based on American comics
Films with screenplays by Jack Townley
1930s English-language films
1930s American films